Meymunaq is a village in Sarajuy-ye Shomali Rural District, in the Central District of Maragheh County, East Azerbaijan Province, Iran. At the 2006 census, its population was 394, in 87 families.

References 

Towns and villages in Maragheh County